Didrik Christensen (30 August 1903 – 24 May 1974) was a Norwegian footballer. He played in two matches for the Norway national football team in 1933.

References

External links
 

1903 births
1974 deaths
Norwegian footballers
Norway international footballers
Sportspeople from Skien
Association football midfielders
Odds BK players